Cheng Wei (born 19 May 1983) is a Chinese  billionaire businessman. He is the founder, chairman and CEO of DiDi, a Chinese mobile transportation platform with global operations. In 2012, after eight years at Alibaba Group's regional and Alipay's operations, Cheng founded Beijing Xiaoju Technology Co Ltd in Zhongguancun.

Biography 
Cheng was born in 1983 in Jiangxi, China. He received a bachelor's degree in administration from Beijing University of Chemical Technology.

After graduation, Cheng served as an assistant to a chairman at a foot massage company. About one year later, Cheng applied to join Alibaba as a sales person for its business-to-business e-commerce service in 2005.

For six years at Alibaba, Cheng served as a sales manager for the northern region of China. He later moved to China's largest third-party online payment platform, Alipay, where he was soon promoted to the position of regional manager.

In 2012, Cheng left Alibaba to found Beijing Xiaoju Technology Co and launch Didi Dache—translated to "Beep Beep Call a Taxi"—as the initial incarnation of his ride-hailing service.

In 2014, Cheng hired Jean Liu (Liu Qing), a former Goldman Sachs Asia managing director, as the COO of the company.

In February 2015, the company merged with its rival Kuaidi Dache and was renamed Didi Kuaidi (later renamed Didi Chuxing or “DiDi”).

In August 2016, DiDi acquired all assets of the Chinese division of Uber.

Since the company was founded in 2012, under the leadership of Cheng Wei and Jean Liu, DiDi has grown to become one of the world’s highest valued tech start-ups.

Other activities 

In September 2015, Cheng was selected as a co-chair of the Summer Davos in Asia: Annual Meeting of the New Champions 2015.

Published work 
DiDi: The Sharing Economy is Changing China co-authored by Jean Liu and Zhang Xiaofeng, ed. Posts & Telecom Press, June 2016.

Prizes 
2019: Fortune China’s list of 50 Most Influential Business Leaders
2018: 50 Most influential business leaders in China by Forbes China
2017: 50 Most Influential Business Leaders by Fortune China
2017: Global Game Changers by Forbes
2017: 20 Most Influential People in Tech list by the Time magazine 
2016: Businessperson of the Year by Fortune magazine and Forbes Asia's Businessman of the Year
2016: Wired 100 List.
2015: "Top 10 Economic Influencers of China" by Sina.com.
2015: "40 under 40" list by Fortune magazine.

References

1983 births
Living people
Beijing University of Chemical Technology alumni
Chinese chief executives
Chinese company founders
Businesspeople from Jiangxi
People from Shangrao
Alibaba Group people
DiDi people
21st-century Chinese businesspeople
Chinese billionaires